Carnival glass is moulded or pressed glass to which an iridescent surface shimmer has been applied. It has previously been referred to as aurora glass, dope glass, rainbow glass, taffeta glass, and disparagingly as 'poor man's Tiffany'. The name Carnival glass was adopted by collectors in the 1950s as items of it were sometimes given as prizes at carnivals, fetes, and fairgrounds. However, evidence suggests that the vast majority of it was purchased by households to brighten homes at a time when only the well-off could afford bright electric lighting, as its finish catches the light even in dark corners. From the beginning of the 20th century, carnival glass was mass-produced around the world, but largely and initially in the U.S. It reached the height of its popularity in the 1920s, though it is still produced in small quantities today.

Carnival glass gets its iridescent sheen from the application of metallic salts while the glass is still hot from the pressing. It was designed to look like the much finer and much more expensive blown iridescent glass by makers such as Tiffany. Both functional and ornamental objects were produced in the carnival finish and patterns ranged from simple through geometric and 'cut' styles to pictorial and figurative. A wide range of colours and colour combinations, and scarcely used colours can command very high prices on the collector market.

History

Carnival glass originated as a glass called 'Iridill', produced beginning in 1908 by the Fenton Art Glass Company (founded in 1905).  Iridill was inspired by the fine blown art glass of such makers as Tiffany and Steuben, but did not sell at the anticipated premium prices and was subsequently discounted.  After these markdowns, Iridill pieces were used as carnival prizes.

Iridill became popular and very profitable for Fenton, which produced many different types of items in this finish, in over 150 patterns.  Fenton maintained their position as the largest manufacturer and were one of very few makers to use a red coloured glass base for their carnival glass. After interest waned in the late 1920s, Fenton stopped producing carnival glass for many years. In more recent years, due to a resurgence in interest, Fenton restarted production of carnival glass until its closure in 2007.

Most U.S. carnival glass was made before 1925, with production in clear decline after 1931. Some important production continued outside the US through the depression years of the early 1930s, tapering off to very little by the 1940s.

Often the same moulds were used to produce clear and transparent coloured glass as well as carnival versions, so producers could switch production between these finishes easily according to demand.

Variations

Colours
Carnival glass was made in a wide array of colours, shades, colour combinations and variants. More than fifty have been formally classified. These classifications do not go by the surface colours showing, which can be even more varied, but by the 'base' colours of the glass before application of the iridizing mineral salts.

In order to establish the base colour, one finds an area of the item which had no mineral salts applied (often the base) and holds the item up to the light in such a way that the area in question can be seen through. This is usually easy enough to do, but it can still be difficult for the inexperienced to differentiate the exact base colour between the many possibilities, as there are often only subtle differences and variations.

The final (post doping) surface shades also vary according to the depth of base colour, as well as any special treatments and the type and amount of salts used. This last variable caused significant variation to occur, even between batches of what should have been essentially the same colour or colour-way. This happened most frequently in early production but to such an extent that collectors now differentiate between these items, describing the degree of iridescence showing.

The most popular colour for carnival glass is now known by collectors as 'marigold' although that name was not in use at the time. Marigold has a clear glass base and is the most easily recognizable carnival colour. The final surface colours of marigold are mostly a bright orange-gold turning perhaps to copper with small areas showing rainbow or 'oil-slick' highlights. The highlights appear mostly on ridges in the pattern and vary in strength according to the light.

Marigold carnival glass is the most frequently found colour and in general commands lower prices in the collector market. However, variants of marigold such as those based on 'moonstone', a translucent white, and 'milk glass', an opaque white base, can be more sought after. Other base colours include; amethyst, a reddish purple; blue, green, red and amber. These basic colours are then further delineated by shade; depth of colour; colour combinations such as 'amberina'; colour pattern such as 'slag'; special treatments such as 'opalescent' and finally luminescence such as that given off by 'vaseline glass' or 'uranium glass' under ultra violet light (blacklight).

Shapes
Carnival Glass was produced in a wide variety of items, from utilitarian to the purely decorative. Even within groups of items a variety of shapes can be found with further variation in edging and bases as well as different treatments of the basic shape while still malleable fresh from the mould.
For example, of three items coming from the same mould, one could be left as is, another folded inwards and the third splayed outwards. Edge styles varied from plain to include frilled after moulding, or  pie crust, furrowed or bullet, as a part of the mould pattern. 
  
The basic items produced included bowls, plates, vases, jugs or pitchers and tumblers but many other more specialised items of tableware were made also. These included large centre piece items such as jardinières and float bowls as well as smaller useful items such as butter dishes, celery vases and cruet sets. In smaller numbers and less often found are items to do with lighting or associated with smoking and those designed solely for show as ornaments such as figural sculptures or statuettes.

Patterns

Carnival glass was produced in large quantities in the US by the Fenton, Northwood, Imperial, Millersburg, Westmoreland (also began producing in 1908), Dugan/Diamond, Cambridge, and U.S. Glass companies as well as many smaller manufacturers. Competition became so fierce that new patterns were continually being developed, so each company ended up making a wide range of patterns of most types adding up to a panoply of choice. By selling sample pieces to carnival fair operators, it was hoped that a winner would then go on to purchase further items in the same or a similar pattern. Pressed glass 'blancs' were brought in and iridized by third parties as well.

Different and in many cases highly distinctive carnival glass patterns were designed and made by non-US makers, most notably by Crown Crystal of Australia, now famed for their depiction of that continent's distinctive fauna and flora in their glass. Sowerby (England) are notable for their use of swan, hen and dolphin figural pieces in carnival finish as well as pieces which have figural parts such as bird figured legs. There is even a figural boat. Of their non-figural production, the strong, bold and easily recognizable 'African Shield', 'King James' and 'Drape' patterns provided a good canvas for shimmering carnival colours.

German production of carnival was dominated by the Brockwitz glassworks, with mainly geometric patterns which take their cues from cut glass. Other major European makers included Inwald (Czechoslovakia), Eda glasbruk (Sweden) and Riihimäki (Finland). These again produced cut glass styles and simple geometrics with a few floral patterns. However, the most distinctive continental European patterns are probably the similarly styled 'Classic Arts' & 'Egyptian Queen', produced by the Czech Rindskopf works, sporting stained bands of figures over a very simple geometric form in a very even marigold.

In other parts of the world most notable are the Argentinian Cristalerias Rigolleau for their innovative and highly distinctive ash trays and Cristalerias Piccardo for their highly desirable 'Jewelled Peacock Tail' vase. Finally, the Indian Jain company should not go unmentioned, notable for their distinctive elephant, fish and hand figural sections incorporated into the body of trumpet shaped vases and for their desirable and highly complex goddess vases.

Collectibles market
Carnival glass is highly collectible. Prices vary widely, with some pieces worth very little, while other, rare items command thousands of dollars. Examples of carnival glass can be easily found in antique stores and eBay.

Identification of carnival glass is frequently difficult. Many manufacturers did not include a maker's mark on their product, and some did for only part of the time they produced the glass. Identifying carnival glass involves matching patterns, colours, sheen, edges, thickness, and other factors from old manufacturer's trade catalogs, other known examples, or other reference material. Since many manufacturers produced close copies of their rivals' popular patterns, carnival glass identification can be challenging even for an expert.

See also

Pressed glass
Uranium glass
Goofus glass

References

External links

The Carnival Glass Society UK
Carnival Glass Collectors Association of Australia
Woodsland World Wide Carnival Glass Association
David Doty's Carnival Glass web site contains an index of patterns and manufacturers
Glen and Stephen Thistlewood's Carnival Glass website
Webpage with basic summary on Carnival Glass

Glass types
Collecting